Robert Powell is a botanical author from Perth, Western Australia who has co-written a number of books with Jane Emberson about the plants and trees of the Swan Coastal Plain and adjacent Darling Scarp.

His book An old look at trees.. was the careful archival retrieval of rarely seen photographs of coastal vegetation, jarrah and marri trees long since destroyed by urban development in the Perth region.  It also provided very careful  annotation of remnant vegetation, and appraisals of remnant vegetation in the region - with the Woodman Point book being a survey of an area to that point relatively undisturbed coastal vegetation.  The later publications were more studies of the potential plants for utilisation in the Perth metropolitan area.

Robert has also worked for CALM and written and produced photographs for its publications on plants, as well as other subjects.

Publication list
 Robert Powell & Jane Emberson  cited as main authors: -
(1978) An old look at trees : vegetation of south-western Australia in old photographs Perth, W.A.: Campaign to Save Native Forests (W.A.). 
(1979) The self-effacing gardener : a natural plant community in the garden  illustrated by Susan Tingay. Wembley, W.A.: Organic Growers Association W.A. 
(1981)  Woodman Point : a relic of Perth's coastal vegetation Perth, W.A., Artlook,  
(1990)  Leaf and branch : trees and tall shrubs of Perth  with assistance from Stephen Hopper and Peter McMillan ; illustrated by Margaret Pieroni and Susan Patrick ; with a foreword by George Seddon. Perth, W.A.: Dept. of Conservation and Land Management. 
(1996)  Growing locals : gardening with local plants in Perth with assistance from Vanda Longman ; illustrated by Susan Tingay ; with a foreword by John Colwill.  Nedlands, W.A. : Western Australian Naturalists' Club with support from the Water & Rivers Commission of Western Australia.  

Writers from Perth, Western Australia
Living people
Year of birth missing (living people)